Bauhinia stenantha is a species of plant in the family Fabaceae. It is found only in Ecuador. Its natural habitat is subtropical or tropical dry shrubland.

References

stenantha
Endemic flora of Ecuador
Endangered flora of South America
Taxonomy articles created by Polbot